The Kings's Scholarships (formerly Queen's Scholarships) are forty-eight scholarships (eight per year until Sixth Form, then twelve per year) at Westminster School, (re)founded in 1560 by Queen Elizabeth I. The scholars take part in the coronation in Westminster Abbey, acclaiming the new monarch by shouting "Vivat". They also have the right to observe Parliament. They have the abbreviation KS (formerly QS) on school lists; their house is "College".

Twelve- and thirteen-year-old boys annually compete for eight of the annual scholarships in a competitive entrance examination known as the Challenge. Fifteen- and sixteen-year-old girls compete for the other four scholarships, which are awarded to the top four students in subject-specific Sixth Form entrance exams. For 400 years the best of the scholars were elected to closed scholarships at Christ Church, Oxford, and Trinity College, Cambridge; since the 1970s, Westminster School boys and girls must win open Oxbridge scholarships by public examination.

Prior to 2017, only 40 scholarships were available, and all were awarded to boys sitting the Challenge. The four Sixth Form girls' scholarships were launched in 2017.

During the reign of a king, the Queen's Scholars become King's Scholars, in contrast to the earlier King's Scholarships at Eton College who retain that title in honour of their royal founder even when the current monarch is a queen.

Notable Queen's Scholars
Richard Hakluyt (1553–1616), Elizabethan writer
George Herbert (1593–1633), poet and priest
William Cartwright (1611–1643), poet and dramatist
Abraham Cowley (1618–1667), poet
John Dryden (1631–1700), poet and playwright
John Locke (1632–1704), philosopher
Robert South (1634–1716), priest and Latin poet
Robert Hooke (1635–1703), scientist and polymath
Warren Hastings (1732–1818), Governor of Calcutta
George Cotton (1813–1866), headmaster and Bishop
A. A. Milne (1882–1956), children's author
John Spedan Lewis (1885–1963), founder of the John Lewis Partnership
Edgar Adrian, 1st Baron Adrian (1889–1977), Nobel Prize-winning scientist
Kim Philby (1912–1988), Russian spy
Jonathan Ashmore (born 1948), physicist
Andrew Lloyd Webber (born 1948), composer
Dominic Grieve (born 1956), barrister and former MP
Ian Bostridge (born 1964), tenor
Alastair Sooke (born 1981), art critic

References

Scholarships in the United Kingdom
Westminster School